Che Wan Zalati (born 19 June 1995) is a Malaysian cricketer. He played for Malaysia in the 2017 ICC World Cricket League Division Three tournament in May 2017. In April 2018, he was named in Malaysia's squad for the 2018 ICC World Cricket League Division Four tournament, also in Malaysia.

References

External links
 

1995 births
Living people
Malaysian cricketers
Place of birth missing (living people)